Kowalski (feminine: Kowalska, plural: Kowalscy) is the second most common surname in Poland (140,471 people in 2009). Kowalski surname is derived from the word kowal, meaning "[black]smith".

"Jan Kowalski" is a  name that is used as a placeholder name in Poland in the meaning of "Average Joe", similar to  "John Smith", its rough English-language equivalent, in English-speaking countries. (though a more direct translation would be "John Smithson").

Notable people
 Alexander Kowalski (1902–1940), Polish ice hockey player killed in the Katyn massacre
 Aleksander Kowalski (1930–2009), Polish Nordic combined skier
 Alexander Kowalski (musician) (born 1978), German DJ, electronic music artist
 Alfred Kowalski-Wierusz (1849–1915), Polish painter
 Aneta Kowalska (born 1982), Polish pair skater
 Annette Kowalski (born 1936), American producer, business partner of Bob Ross
 Bernard Louis Kowalski (1929–2007), American director
 Bronisława Kowalska (1955–2020), Polish politician
 Chana Kowalska (1899-1942), Polish Jewish painter and journalist
 Craig Kowalski (born 1981), American ice hockey player
 Daniel Kowalski (born 1975), Australian Olympic swimmer
 Faustyna Kowalska (1905–1938), Polish Catholic saint, nun and mystic
 Franciszek Kowalski (1799–1862), Polish poet, insurgent of the November Uprising
 Frank Kowalski (1907–1974), American US Army soldier and United States Representative
 Gary A. Kowalski (born 1953), American author
 Grzegorz Kowalski (disambiguation)
 James Kowalski (born 1954), United States Air Force Lieutenant General, Commander of Air Force Global Strike Command Barksdale AFB
 Janusz Kowalski (born 1952), Polish cyclist
 Jerzy Kowalski (disambiguation)
 Jochen Kowalski (born 1954), German singer
 John Kowalski (born c. 1951), American soccer coach
 Józef Kowalski (1900–2013), Polish supercentenarian and second-to-last Polish-Soviet war veteran
 Józef Kowalski (1911–1942), Polish Roman Catholic priest killed at Auschwitz, beatified
 Józef Wierusz-Kowalski (1866–1927), Polish physicist and diplomat
 Kasia Kowalska (born 1973), Polish pop rock singer and songwriter
 Katarzyna Kowalska (born 1985), Polish long distance runner
 Kazimierz Kowalski, Polish singer
 Ken Kowalski (born 1945), Canadian politician
 Kerstin Kowalski (born 1976), German rower
 Ludwik Kowalski (born 1931), Polish-American nuclear physicist and professor emeritus
 Łukasz Kowalski, Polish footballer
 Manja Kowalski (born 1976), German rower
 Maria Kowalska, Polish alpine skier
 Marian Albertovich Kowalski (1821–1884), Polish astronomer
 Saint Faustina Kowalska (1905–1938), Catholic saint
 Myron Kowalsky (born 1941), Canadian politician
 Natalia Kowalska (born 1989), Polish racing driver
 Natalia Kowalska (1918–unknown), Polish chess master
 Piotr Kowalski (1927-2004), French-Polish artist
 Richard Kowalski (born 1963), American astronomer
 Robert Kowalski (born 1941), British logician
 Sharon Kowalski, subject of groundbreaking disability and LGBT legal rights case
 Tadeusz Kowalski (1841–1904), Polish agronomist, agricultural activist and educator
 Tadeusz Kowalski (1889–1948), Polish orientalist, expert on Middle East Muslim culture and languages
 Thomas Schmidt-Kowalski (1949–2013), German composer
 Wacław Kowalski, Polish actor
 William Kowalski (born 1970), American author
 Wladek Kowalski (AKA "Killer" Kowalski) (1926–2008), Polish-Canadian professional wrestler, trainer
 Władysław Kowalski (politician) (1894–1958), Polish trade union activist, writer and politician (PSL, ZSL)
 Yelizaveta Kovalskaya (1851–1943), Russian revolutionary
 Stanisław Kowalski (1910–2022), Polish supercentenarian masters athlete.

Fictional characters
 Kowalski, character in the 1991 parody film Hot Shots!, played by Kristy Swanson
 Kowalski, main character in the 1971 film Vanishing Point, played by Barry Newman
 Kowalski, character in the PlayStation 2 game Syphon Filter 2
 Kowalski, character in Madagascar and the TV series The Penguins of Madagascar
 Mr Kowalski, original owner of Kowalski's, Rosie Duncan's florist store in the novel Fairytale of New York
 Mrs. Kowalski, Miriam Margolyes' character in the film How to Lose Friends & Alienate People (2008)
 Baby Kowalski, supporting character in The Ren & Stimpy Show
 Benjamin "Ben" Kowalski in the comic series Templar, Arizona
 Major Charles Kawalsky, a character in the science fiction movie Stargate and subsequent television series Stargate SG-1
 Dick Kowalsky, character in the French animated series Funky Cops (2003)
 Felix Kawalski, character in the British television series EastEnders
 Jacob Kowalski, Dan Fogler's character in the film Fantastic Beasts and Where to Find Them (2016)
 Joe Kowalski, character in SIGMA Force book series by author James Rollins
 Kitty Kowalski, Lex Luthor's companion in 2006 film Superman Returns, played by Parker Posey
 Leon Kowalski, character in the 1982 film Blade Runner played by Brion James
 Matt Kowalsky, George Clooney's character in the movie Gravity
 Peter "Petey" Kowalski in the video game Bully
 Private Kowalski, character in the video game Fallout: New Vegas
 Roch Kowalski, character in Sienkiewicz's novel With Fire and Sword
 Roxanne Kowalski, Daryl Hannah's character in Roxanne, the 1987 remake of Cyrano de Bergerac with Steve Martin
 Seaman Kowalski, crewman assigned aboard the submarine SSRN Seaview, on the 1964–68 TV series Voyage to the Bottom of the Sea, played by Del Monroe
 Sergei Kowalski, the titular character in the Spaghetti Western The Mercenary, played by Franco Nero.
 Sgt. Kowalski, character in Raising Arizona
 Sgt. Kowalski, character in video game Call of Duty 3
 Sophie Kowalski, Marion Cotillard's character in the 2005 French film Jeux d'Enfants, also known by its English title, Love Me If You Dare
 Stanley and Stella Kowalski, characters in the Pulitzer Prize–winning play by Tennessee Williams and 1951 film, A Streetcar Named Desire
 Detective Stanley Kowalski, character in the 1994–1999 television series Due South (named after the above Streetcar character)
 Steve Kowalski, character in the 2007 film Devil's Diary
 Viktor Kowalski, member of the OAS in The Day of the Jackal by Frederick Forsyth
 Walt Kowalski, protagonist of the 2008 film Gran Torino played by Clint Eastwood
 Meryl Lee Kowalski, character in the Gary D. Schmidt book The Wednesday Wars

See also

Other uses 
 Kowalski's Markets, supermarket chain

References

Polish-language surnames
Occupational surnames